The Association of Armenian Scouts (Armenian: Haï Ari, alternately Association des Scouts Armeniens) was the Armenian Scouting in Exile movement recognized by the World Organization of the Scout Movement. In 1929 the Association of Armenian Scouts, centered in Paris, was given recognition as a member of the International Conference. Haï Ari (in French Association des Scouts Armeniens, in English Association of Armenian Scouts) was a member of the World Organization of the Scout Movement from 1929 to 1997. The organization was recognized in exile, with headquarters and approximately 1,100 members in France.

History 
Scouting in Armenia was founded in 1912, then later developed abroad among the refugees who had survived the genocide of 1915-1916 and among those that had fled the new communist occupation of their lands, at which point Scouting ceased to exist in Armenia.

Dr. Kourkène Medzadourian, Chief Scout of Armenia, moved to France, where troops of Armenian Scouts were established in large cities.

In 1929, World Scouting recognized the Association of Armenian Scouts, Haï Ari, based in France. While the Association did not have its own territorial base, it was the exception to the rule, remaining a member of the World Organization and the European Scout Region.

In April 1939, J. S. Wilson paid a visit in Paris for the tenth anniversary of the recognition of the Association of Armenian Scouts.

At its meeting in 1945, the International Committee considered the standing of the two non-territorial National Scout Organizations, the Association des Scouts Armeniens and the Association Nationale des Scouts Russes. It was proved that the Armenian organization was very much alive, and that it had members in various countries, some of whom could not be recognized as Scouts without the existence of the Armenian organization. The same did not appear to be the case with the Russian Scouts, whose membership had dwindled and seemed to be confined to displaced persons (DP) camps. The Committee felt that the continued registration of the Association Nationale des Scouts Russes was not justified. The policy adopted in 1947 and reaffirmed in 1949 remained as it was until 1957, when the Committee decided to reconsider the whole question of policy in view of changed conditions.

In 1994, Hayastani Azgayin Scautakan Sharjum Kazmakerputiun (HASK - the Armenian National Scout Movement) was born. The French-based Association of Armenian Scouts withdrew from membership in order to allow Scouting in Armenia to join the World Organization. Membership in the World Organization passed to HASK on April 18, 1997.

The former refugee organization disbanded on January 9, 1998.

Ideals
The Scout Motto is Միշտ պատրաստ, Misht Badrast, Always Ready in Armenian.

The Scout emblem incorporated the national colors as well as Mount Ararat, also an element of the coat of arms of Armenia.

Further reading
 Scouting Round the World, John S. Wilson, first edition, Blandford Press 1959 p. 62 105 154.

References

See also

 Scouting in Armenia

Scouting and Guiding in France
Disbanded Scouting organizations
Exile organizations
Scouting and Guiding in Armenia
Youth organizations established in 1929
Organizations disestablished in 1998
1929 establishments in France